Private Music was an American independent record label founded in 1984 by musician Peter Baumann as a "home for instrumental music". Baumann signed Ravi Shankar, Yanni, Suzanne Ciani, Andy Summers, Patrick O'Hearn, Leo Kottke, and his former bandmates, Tangerine Dream. The label specialized in New age music but made a sharp turn to the mainstream by signing Taj Mahal, Ringo Starr, Etta James, and A. J. Croce. Its albums were distributed by BMG (the label's earliest recordings having been distributed by RCA), which bought Private Music in 1996.

History

In 1989, Baumann hired veteran music executive Ron Goldstein of Warner Bros. Records as Private Music's president and CEO. Goldstein moved the offices from New York City to Los Angeles, hiring Karen Johnson to expand the label's image. Baumann recruited the well-respected, mainstream A&R executive Jamie Cohen. Visual image was important to Goldstein, who handpicked art director Melanie Penny, previously of Virgin Records and Warner Bros., as VP, Creative Services, through the life of Private Music.

Private Music emphasized its "artist re-development" efforts, supporting such eclectic veteran artists as Taj Mahal, Ringo Starr, Etta James, Jennifer Warnes, The Fabulous Thunderbirds, Toots Thielemans, Jimmy Witherspoon, Kate & Anna McGarrigle, Eliza Gilkyson, Joy Askew, The Pahinui Brothers, and Kenny Rankin, while expanding the catalogs of Yanni, Leo Kottke, Andy Summers, and Ravi Shankar, with strong "debut support" for A. J. Croce and Susan Werner. An international marketing department was added, led by longtime Sony Music executive J.P. Bommel.

Private Music's recordings earned multiple Grammy Awards and nominations, including Etta James's first career win, in 1994, for best jazz vocal performance on Mystery Lady: Songs of Billie Holiday, her debut of three albums on the label. Private's roster achieved high recognition on national television. Numerous artist appearances included interviews and performances on late-night talk shows and morning shows, MTV, and VH1.

Private's Grammy winner Taj Mahal spawned the Grammy-winning Phantom Blues Band. With its increasing influence in blues and roots music, and at the peak of its performance in record sales, Private Music entered into a joint venture with House of Blues' record label, featuring such artists as Cissy Houston and John Mooney.

In 2001, Private Music became part of the short-lived Arista Associated Labels, which also included Windham Hill Records. By 2004, after Sony and BMG merged, the label's releases switched to RCA. Following his Private Music tenure, Goldstein served as president and CEO of the Verve Music Group label at Universal Music Group, in New York City.

Notable albums
Private Music has released a number of notable albums:

See also
 Music West Records

References

External links
 

 
 
American independent record labels
Blues record labels
Experimental music record labels
Jazz record labels
Record labels established in 1984